San Jose is a settlement (sometimes termed a village or district) on the island of Saipan in the Northern Mariana Islands.

References

Towns and villages in the Northern Mariana Islands
Saipan